Crown Point is the name of several places:

Australia
Crown Point Station, a pastoral lease in the Northern Territory, Australia

Trinidad and Tobago
Crown Point, Tobago, an area on the island of Tobago in Trinidad and Tobago
Crown Point Airport, the former name of the Arthur Napoleon Raymond Robinson International Airport that serves the island of Tobago

United Kingdom
Crown Point, Norwich, England
Crown Point TMD, railway depot in Norwich, England
Crown Point, a district and community in South London, England
Crown Point, Denton, the crossroads of the A57 (Hyde Road) and A6017 (Stockport Road)

United States 
Crown Point, Alaska
Crown Point, California extends into Mission Bay, San Diego
Crown Point, Indiana,  Lake County
Crown Point, New York
Fort Crown Point, built in 1759 on Lake Champlain by the British
The Battle of Crown Point during the American Revolutionary War
Crown Point, Oregon (disambiguation), various places
Crown Point (Sierra Nevada), a mountain in California
Crown Point in Westminster, Colorado
Crown Point (Oregon)
Crown Point, Louisiana